The British farthing (from Old English fēorðing, from fēorða, a fourth) abbreviated qua. Before Decimal Day in 1971, Britain used the Carolingian monetary system, wherein the largest unit was a pound sterling of 20 shillings, each of 12 pence. Each penny was divided into 4 farthings, thus, a pound sterling contained 960 farthings, and a shilling contained 48 farthings. From 1860 to 1971, the purchasing power of a farthing ranged between 12p and 0.2p in 2017 values.

The farthing coin was legal tender during the reigns of eleven British monarchs: George I, George II, and George III, George IV, William IV, and Victoria, Edward VII and George V, Edward VIII, George VI, and Elizabeth II. In Britain and Northern Ireland the farthing coin ceased to be legal tender on 1 January 1961; however, the farthing remaind legal tender in the Falkland Islands, the Falkland Islands Dependencies, and the British Antarctic Territory until 31 October 1970.

In two-and-a-half centuries in circulation as British currency, the reverse face of the farthing coin was minted in two designs: (i) from the 18th century until 1936, the farthing featured the figure of Britannia; and (ii) from 1937, the farthing featured the image of a wren. Like all British coins, the obverse face of the farthing coin bore the portrait of the incumbent monarch.

History

A British copper farthing succeeded the English farthing after England and Scotland were united into the Kingdom of Great Britain in 1707, although not immediately. Under Queen Anne, a small number of pattern farthings were struck, but none for circulation, as so many English farthings from previous reigns were still available. Some British copper farthings were struck in the reigns of George I and George II. By the accession of George III, in 1760, many counterfeits were in circulation, and the Royal Mint stopped minting copper coins in 1775. The next farthings were the first struck by steam power, in 1799 by Matthew Boulton at his Soho Mint, under licence. Boulton coined more in 1806, and the Royal Mint resumed production in 1821. The farthing was struck regularly under George IV and William IV, by then with a design very like a smaller version of the penny.

Values less than a pound were usually written in terms of shillings and pence, e.g. three shillings and six pence (3/6), pronounced "three and six" or "three and sixpence". Values of less than a shilling were simply written in pence, e.g. (8d), pronounced "eightpence". A price with a farthing in it would be written like this: (d), pronounced "twopence [or tuppence] farthing", or (1/), pronounced "one and threepence [or thruppence] farthing" or (19/), pronounced "nineteen and eleven three farthing(s)".  19/ was a value used to make goods seem "significantly" cheaper than £1, usage similar to the modern £19.99, which is also the approximate value in 2021 of 19/ in 1961, the year when the farthing was withdrawn from circulation.

The first bronze farthings were struck in 1860, in the reign of Queen Victoria, with a new reverse designed by Leonard Charles Wyon. Between 1860 and 1895 there is a lighthouse to Britannia's left and a ship to her right. Various minor adjustments were made over the years to the level of the sea around Britannia and the angle of her trident. Some issues feature toothed edges to the coin, while others feature beading.

After 1860, seven different obverses were used. Edward VII, George V, George VI and Elizabeth II each had a single obverse for the farthings produced during their respective reigns. Over the long reign of Queen Victoria, two different obverses were used. The farthing of 1860 carried the so-called "bun head", or "draped bust" of Queen Victoria on the obverse. The inscription around the bust read  (abbreviated Latin: Victoria by the grace of God queen of Britain defender of the faith). This was replaced in 1895 by the "old head", or "veiled bust". The inscription on these coins read  (Victoria by the grace of God queen of Britain defender of the faith empress of India).

Farthings issued during the reign of Edward VII feature his likeness and bear the inscription  (Edward VII by the grace of God king of all Britons defender of the faith emperor of India). Similarly, those issued during the reign of George V feature his likeness and bear the inscription  (George V by the grace of God king of all Britons defender of the faith emperor of India).

A farthing of King Edward VIII (reigned 1936) does exist, dated 1937, but technically it is a pattern coin, one produced for official approval, which it was due to receive at about the time that the King abdicated, and in the event no farthings bearing his likeness were ever issued.

One feature of the pattern farthing of Edward VIII was a redesigned reverse displaying the wren, one of Britain's smallest birds. From 1937 this appeared on the regular-issue farthings of George VI and was continued in the 1950s on the farthings of Elizabeth II.

Obverse designs

Mintages

See also

 Pound sterling
 Mill (currency)

References

External links

British Coins – information about British coins (from 1656 to 1952)
Collection of copper & bronze pennies of Great Britain
About Farthings A photographic collection of farthings
My Farthing Collection A private collection of farthings dating from 1799–1956

Coins of Great Britain
Pre-decimalisation coins of the United Kingdom
Coins of the United Kingdom